Maria Carlotta of Parma (Maria Carlotta Ferdinanda Teresa Anna Giuseppa Giovanna Luisa Vincenza Rosalia; Parma, Italy, 1 September 1777 – Rome, Italy, 6 April 1813) was a Princess of Parma and Infanta of Spain, daughter of Ferdinand, Duke of Parma and his wife, Archduchess Maria Amalia of Austria. She joined the Dominican Order under the name of Sister Giacinta Domenica.

Biography

Early years 

Maria Carlotta was the fourth child of the nine children born to Ferdinand, Duke of Parma and his wife, Archduchess Maria Amalia of Austria, princess of Hungary and Bohemia. Her father Ferdinand was the only son of Philip, Duke of Parma and Princess Louise Élisabeth of France. In turn, Felipe was the son of King Philip V of Spain, and her mother Louise Élisabeth was one of the daughters of King Louis XV. Her mother, Maria Amalia, was a daughter of Empress Maria Theresa and Emperor Francis I.

Her mother and her aunt, Queen Maria Carolina, negotiated Carlotta's marriage with her first cousin Francis, Duke of Calabria. Francis was supposed to ask for the princess's hand when they were both 18 years old.

In 1795, the moment arrived, but Francis, due to his shyness, asked her mother to annul the marriage, to which she accepted and the possibilities that Carlotta would be a nun became greater.

French occupation 
In 1796, Parma was occupied by France. Her parents were allowed to remain formally in power, but guarded by an entourage of French guards. Carlotta and her sister Maria Antonia were granted freedom, being considered apolitical. Both sisters remained by their side. parents as support during the French occupation, and were known to possess the religiosity of their father and the willpower of their mother. However, while Maria Antonia was described as particularly severe and reserved, Carlotta demanded from the French governor a pension to live up to her princess status.

Later life 
On the death of their father in October 1802, both sisters and their mother attended his funeral. When her mother was exiled by the French after her funeral, they accompanied her to Prague, where they kept her company until her death in 1804. During her stay in Prague, she and her sister were described as humble and spent their time praying.

When she was 20 years old, she entered the Dominican Order under the name Sister Giacinta Domenica, beginning her novitiate in the Dominican convent of Parma. Her illustrious birth allowed her to go to the Colorno monastery where she became prioress. During the following years she led a quiet and modest life in the convent, where she died on April 6, 1813 at the age of 35.

Ancestry

Honorific distinctions 

  Dame of the Order of Queen Maria Luisa from 1792.

References

External links 

Hereditary Princesses of Parma
Dominican abbesses
1777 births
1813 deaths
House of Bourbon-Parma
Princesses of Bourbon-Parma
Spanish infantas
Daughters of monarchs